Devran is a Turkish given name. People named Devran include:
 *  Devran Ayhan (born 1978), Turkish footballer
 * Devran Tanaçan (born 1986), Turkish basketball player
 Devran may refer to the Sufi ritual 

Books
Devran may also refer to the book by Selahattin Demirtaş
Turkish unisex given names